2008 Kyoto Sanga F.C. season

Competitions

Domestic results

J. League 1

Emperor's Cup

J. League Cup

Player statistics

Other pages
 J. League official site

Kyoto Sanga F.C.
Kyoto Sanga FC seasons